Andrea Hlaváčková and Lucie Hradecká were the defending champions, but chose to participate at the 2015 WTA Finals instead.

Andreea Mitu and Monica Niculescu won the title, defeating Stéphanie Foretz and Amandine Hesse in the final, 6–7(5–7), 7–6(7–2), [10–8].

Seeds

Draw

Draw

References
Main Draw

Internationaux Feminins de la Vienne - Doubles